Asbrahan (also Romanized as Asbrāhān; also known as Asb Rāhān) is a village in Tutaki Rural District, in the Central District of Siahkal County, Gilan Province, Iran. At the 2006 census, its population was 87, in 22 families.

References 

Populated places in Siahkal County